Estádio Municipal Carlos Zamith is a multi-use stadium in Manaus, Amazonas, Brazil. It is used mostly for football matches, and has a maximum capacity of 6,500 people.

Initially projected to be a training center for the 2014 FIFA World Cup, the construction of the stadium began on 5 August 2013, and had an initial cost of R$ 14 million. Named after Carlos Zamith, a notable sports journalist of the state who had died at the time, the stadium had a symbolic inauguration on 24 May 2014, with state governor José Melo de Oliveira providing the first kick.

References

Football venues in Amazonas (Brazilian state)
Sports venues in Amazonas (Brazilian state)
Manaus Futebol Clube
Nacional Futebol Clube
Amazonas Futebol Clube